Talqur (also Romanized as Talqūr; also known as Talghūr, Tulghur, and Tūlqūr) is a village in Darzab Rural District, in the Central District of Mashhad County, Razavi Khorasan Province, Iran. At the 2006 census, its population was 503, in 113 families.

References 

Populated places in Mashhad County